The 2016 UEFA European Under-19 Championship was the 15th edition of the UEFA European Under-19 Championship (65th edition if the Under-18 and Junior eras are included), the annual European international youth football championship contested by the men's under-19 national teams of UEFA member associations. Germany, which were selected by UEFA on 20 March 2012, hosted the tournament between 11 and 24 July 2016.

A total of eight teams competed in the final tournament, with players born on or after 1 January 1997 eligible to participate.

Same as previous editions held in even-numbered years, the tournament acted as the UEFA qualifiers for the FIFA U-20 World Cup. The top five teams qualified for the 2017 FIFA U-20 World Cup in South Korea as the UEFA representatives. This was decreased from the previous six teams, as FIFA decided to give one of the slots originally reserved for UEFA to the Oceania Football Confederation starting from 2017.

Qualification

The national teams from all 54 UEFA member associations entered the competition. With Germany automatically qualified as hosts, the other 53 teams contested a qualifying competition to determine the remaining seven spots in the final tournament. The qualifying competition consisted of two rounds: the qualifying round, which took place in autumn 2015, and the elite round, which took place in spring 2016.

Qualified teams
The following eight teams qualified for the final tournament:

Note: All appearance statistics include only U-19 era (since 2002).

Final draw
The final draw was held on 12 April 2016, 18:00 CEST (UTC+2), at the Mercedes-Benz Arena in Stuttgart, Germany. The eight teams were drawn into two groups of four teams. There was no seeding, except that hosts Germany were assigned to position A1 in the draw.

Venues
The tournament was hosted in ten venues:

Squads

Each national team had to submit a squad of 18 players.

Match officials
A total of 6 referees, 8 assistant referees and 2 fourth officials were appointed for the final tournament.

Referees
 Aliyar Aghayev (Azerbaijan)
 Alejandro Hernández Hernández (Spain)
 Radu Petrescu (Romania)
 Roi Reinshreiber (Israel)
 Bart Vertenten (Belgium)
 Anatoliy Zhabchenko (Ukraine)

Assistant referees
 Ridiger Çokaj (Albania)
 Igor Demeshko (Russia)
 Milutin Đukić (Montenegro)
 Vladimir Gerasimovs (Lithuania)
 Geir Oskar Isaksen (Norway)
 Douglas Ross (Scotland)
 Birkir Sigurðarson (Iceland)
 Manuel Vidali (Slovenia)

Fourth officials
 Nikola Dabanović (Montenegro)
 Alan Mario Sant (Malta)

Group stage

The final tournament schedule was confirmed on 18 April 2016.

The group winners and runners-up advanced to the semi-finals and qualify for the 2017 FIFA U-20 World Cup. The third-placed teams entered the FIFA U-20 World Cup play-off.

Tiebreakers
The teams were ranked according to points (3 points for a win, 1 point for a draw, 0 points for a loss). If two or more teams were equal on points on completion of the group matches, the following tie-breaking criteria were applied, in the order given, to determine the rankings:
Higher number of points obtained in the group matches played among the teams in question;
Superior goal difference resulting from the group matches played among the teams in question;
Higher number of goals scored in the group matches played among the teams in question;
If, after having applied criteria 1 to 3, teams still had an equal ranking, criteria 1 to 3 were reapplied exclusively to the group matches between the teams in question to determine their final rankings. If this procedure did not lead to a decision, criteria 5 to 9 applied;
Superior goal difference in all group matches;
Higher number of goals scored in all group matches;
If only two teams had the same number of points, and they were tied according to criteria 1 to 6 after having met in the last round of the group stage, their rankings were determined by a penalty shoot-out (not used if more than two teams had the same number of points, or if their rankings were not relevant for qualification for the next stage).
Lower disciplinary points total based only on yellow and red cards received in the group matches (red card = 3 points, yellow card = 1 point, expulsion for two yellow cards in one match = 3 points);
Drawing of lots.

All times were local, CEST (UTC+2).

Group A

Group B

Knockout stage
In the knockout stage, extra time and penalty shoot-out were used to decide the winner if necessary.

On 2 May 2016, the UEFA Executive Committee agreed that the competition would be part of the International Football Association Board's trial to allow a fourth substitute to be made during extra time. In the FIFA U-20 World Cup play-off, Michel Vlap of the Netherlands became the first ever fourth substitute, replacing Laros Duarte at half-time in extra time, followed later by Emmanuel Iyoha of Germany replacing Jannes Horn in the 110th minute.

Bracket

FIFA U-20 World Cup play-off
Winner qualified for 2017 FIFA U-20 World Cup.

Semi-finals

Final

Goalscorers
6 goals

 Jean-Kévin Augustin

5 goals 

 Kylian Mbappé

4 goals

 Philipp Ochs
 Federico Dimarco

3 goals

 Sam Lammers

2 goals

 Isaiah Brown
 Dominic Solanke
 Ludovic Blas
 Steven Bergwijn
 Abdelhak Nouri
 Aurélio Buta

1 goal

 Arnel Jakupovic
 Xaver Schlager
 Josip Brekalo
 Nikola Moro
 Issa Diop
 Lucas Tousart
 Gökhan Gül
 Marvin Mehlem
 Phil Neumann
 Suat Serdar
 Cedric Teuchert
 Manuel Locatelli
 Dennis van der Heijden
 Asumah Abubakar
 Pedro Empis
 Pedro Pacheco
 Gonçalo Rodrigues
 Alexandre Silva

1 own goal

 Silvio Anočić (playing against England)
 Clément Michelin (playing against England)
 Alberto Picchi (playing against England)

Team of the Tournament

Goalkeepers
 Alex Meret
 Pedro Silva

Defenders
 Fikayo Tomori
 Issa Diop
 Christ-Emmanuel Maouassa
 Phil Neumann
 Filippo Romagna
 Rúben Dias

Midfielders
 Xaver Schlager
 Amine Harit
 Lucas Tousart
 Abdelhak Nouri
 Pêpê

Forwards
 Jean-Kévin Augustin
 Ludovic Blas
 Kylian Mbappé
 Sam Lammers
 Buta

Qualified teams for FIFA U-20 World Cup
The following five teams from UEFA qualified for the 2017 FIFA U-20 World Cup.

1 Bold indicates champion for that year. Italic indicates host for that year.

References

External links

2016 final tournament: Germany, UEFA.com

 
2016
Under-19 Championship
2016 Uefa European Under-19 Championship
2015–16 in German football
UEFA European Under-19 Championship
2016 in youth sport
July 2016 events in Germany
2016 in youth association football